Henri Torre (born in Casablanca, Morocco, on 12 April 1933) is a French politician, and a member of the UMP. He was the Budget Minister of France in the early 1970s.

References 

1933 births
Union for a Popular Movement politicians
French Ministers of Budget
Living people
Senators of Ardèche
Légion d'honneur refusals